Nizhneudinsky District is an administrative district, one of the thirty-three in Irkutsk Oblast, Russia. Municipally, it is incorporated as Nizhneudinsky Municipal District. Its administrative center is the town of Nizhneudinsk. Population:  31,122 (2002 Census);

Administrative and municipal status
Within the framework of administrative divisions, Nizhneudinsky District is one of the thirty-three in the oblast. The town of Nizhneudinsk serves as its administrative center. As a municipal division, the district is incorporated as Nizhneudinsky Municipal District.

References

Notes

Sources

Registry of the Administrative-Territorial Formations of Irkutsk Oblast 

Districts of Irkutsk Oblast
